Eikeberg is a village in the municipality of Sande, Norway. Its population (SSB 2005) is 358.
Is the place where Ranghild Jolsen the writer was born, and where Jens Bjorneboe roman "Dream and the wheel" take place.

Villages in Vestfold og Telemark